Jerome Teasley (August 13, 1948 – June 16, 2016) was an American soul drummer and member of the Motown Hall of Fame. He toured extensively with Junior Walker and the All Stars, and also worked with Al Green, Jimi Hendrix, Wilson Pickett, Tina Turner, Bill Carr, and jazz saxophonist Sonny Stitt among many others.

Teasley died on June 16, 2016 in a hospital in Phoenix, Arizona from complications of lung and liver cancer, aged 67.

Discography
Junior Walker - 'Peace & Understanding Is Hard To Find' (STML11234)
Junior Walker - 'Whiskey a Go Go Live' (STML1127)
Junior Walker - 'Home Cooking' (STML/TML11097)
Al Green - 'Back Up Train' (Arista B0009VNBMY)
Sonny Stitt - 'Tornado' (JM1003, JMLP-1003)

References

1948 births
2016 deaths
American male drummers
American drummers
African-American drummers
20th-century African-American people
21st-century African-American people